Katalin Kristó (born 1 December 1983 in Miercurea Ciuc) is a Romanian short track speed skater of Hungarian ethnicity,  who competed at three Winter Olympics in 2002, 2006 and 2010. She achieved her best results in 1,500 meters by finishing 17th and 18th in 2002 and 2006, respectively.

Personal records
As of 28 December 2011

References

1983 births
Living people
Romanian female short track speed skaters
Short track speed skaters at the 2002 Winter Olympics
Short track speed skaters at the 2006 Winter Olympics
Short track speed skaters at the 2010 Winter Olympics
Olympic short track speed skaters of Romania
Sportspeople from Miercurea Ciuc
Székely people
Romanian sportspeople of Hungarian descent